The Thousand-Mile Summer by Colin Fletcher is the author's chronicle of his 1958 hike along the entire eastern edge of California. Fletcher writes of traveling on foot along the Colorado River, though Death Valley and the High Sierra. The book was first published in 1964.

Quotes

External links
colinfletcher.com Memorabilia & tours

American travel books
1964 non-fiction books
Books about California